Sergiu Pușcuța (born 4 September 1972) is a Moldovan economist and politician who was Minister of Finance of the Republic of Moldova in the Chicu Cabinet.

Notes

1972 births
Living people
Politicians from Chișinău
Moldovan Ministers of Finance